JSDC may refer to:

 Jerry Sanders Creative Design Competition.
 Joint Service Defence College.
 Journal of the Society of Dyers and Colourists, a journal relaunched in 2001 as Coloration Technology by the Society of Dyers and Colourists, Bradford, UK.